Nina Kamto Njitam (born 25 June 1983) is a French handball player, born in Cameroon. She plays for the French national team. She participated at the 2008 Summer Olympics in China, where the French team placed fifth, and in the 2012 Summer Olympics, where the French team also finished in 5th.

Individual awards
French Championship Best Defender: 2014

References

1983 births
Living people
Sportspeople from Yaoundé
French female handball players
Handball players at the 2008 Summer Olympics
Handball players at the 2012 Summer Olympics
Olympic handball players of France
Cameroonian emigrants to France
Mediterranean Games competitors for France
Competitors at the 2005 Mediterranean Games